The 2007 season was IFK Göteborg's 102nd in existence, their 75th season in Allsvenskan and their 31st consecutive season in the league. They competed in Allsvenskan and Svenska Cupen. IFK Göteborg won their first domestic title in 11 years. The club also broke its transfer record when Tobias Hysén was bought from Sunderland for 2.5 million euros.

Players

Squad

Club

Other information

Competitions

Overall

Allsvenskan

League table

Results summary

Results by round

Matches
Kickoff times are in UTC+2 unless stated otherwise.

Svenska Cupen

Kickoff times are in UTC+2.

Non competitive

Pre-season
Kickoff times are in UTC+1 unless stated otherwise.

Mid-season
Kickoff times are in UTC+2.

References

IFK Göteborg seasons
IFK Goteborg
Swedish football championship-winning seasons